Donald Bentley Beauman (26 July 1928  – 9 July 1955) was a British Formula One driver who took part in one World Championship Grand Prix.

Beauman was born in Farnborough, Hampshire, the only son of Brigadier General Archibald Bentley Beauman CBE DSO and Bar (30 November 1888 – 22 March 1977). He had a career as a hotelier but began motor racing in 1950.
  
Beauman ran a Cooper 500 for two years in Formula Three before switching to sports car racing, and took on Formula One in 1954 with a Connaught A-Type, sponsored by wealthy privateer Sir Jeremy Boles. He finished eleventh in the British Grand Prix at Silverstone. He achieved some success in Formula Two, with several third and fourth-place finishes and a second place in the Madgwick Cup at Goodwood. In 1955, the weekend before the British Grand Prix, he was killed when he crashed his Connaught during the Leinster Trophy race in Wicklow. He had set the fastest time of 82.94 mph (133.45 km/h) on his first lap but crashed near the Beehive pub on his second and was killed instantly. Beauman's death plus other fatal racing accidents that year brought an end to motor car racing at the Curragh.

Complete Formula One results
(key)

References

External links
 Profile at the 500 Owners' Association

1928 births
1955 deaths
English racing drivers
English Formula One drivers
24 Hours of Le Mans drivers
People from Farnborough, Hampshire
Racing drivers who died while racing
Sport deaths in the Republic of Ireland
World Sportscar Championship drivers